Ferme may refer to:

French ship Ferme (1699), a 72-gun ship of the line of the French Navy
French ship Ferme (1763), a 56-gun Bordelois-class ship of the line of the French Navy
French ship Ferme (1785), a 74-gun Téméraire-class ship of the line of the French Navy

People with the surname
Tadej Ferme (born 1991), Slovenian basketball player

See also
Saint-Ferme, a commune in Nouvelle-Aquitaine, France
Ferm